Min-sun is a Korean unisex given name.  Its meaning differs based on the hanja used to write each syllable of the name. There are 27 hanja with the reading "min" and 41 hanja with the reading "seon" on the South Korean government's official list of hanja which may be used in given names.

People with this name include:
Cho Min-sun (born 1972), South Korean judoka
Kim Gyu-ri (actress, born August 1979), birth name Kim Min-sun, South Korean actress

See also
List of Korean given names

References

Korean unisex given names